Mars is a Taiwanese drama starring Barbie Shu (aka Da S) and Vic Chou of F4 who reunited since Meteor Garden and its sequel Meteor Garden II. It is based on the Japanese shōjo manga series, Mars written by Fuyumi Soryo. It was produced by Comic Ritz International Production and Chai Zhi Ping as producer and directed by Cai Yuexun.

The series was broadcast in Taiwan in 2004 on free-to-air Chinese Television System (CTS) and cable TV Gala Television (GTV) Variety Show/CH 28. It was the 2005 Most Popular Drama of the Year at the 40th Golden Bell Awards, Taiwan.

In 2016 it remade with the same name in Japan.

Synopsis
Chen Ling (陳零) and Chen Sheng (陳聖) (both by Vic Chou) are twin brothers born out of wedlock, by a father who is their mother's brother-in-law, and has died in a racing incident. Their one childhood memory of their mother is that of a medicated cold bed-bound woman, whose only words were that "in this world Sheng is the only one Ling can rely on and Ling is the only one Sheng can rely on".

One day Ling meets Qi Luo, an introvert and a gentle girl, in a park where he asks her for directions. She draws the directions for Ling on the back of one of her sketches of a mother and child. Ling seeing her quietly drawing on a park bench reminds him of Sheng and becomes attracted to her. When Ling saves Qi Luo from being sexually harassed by their English teacher, she starts to open up to him. In exchange for the finished painting of 'Mother and Child', Ling promises to protect her.

Cast
 Vic Chou as Chen Ling and Chen Sheng 
 Barbie Hsu as Han Qi-luo 
 Hsiu Chieh-kai as An Da-ye 
 Megan Lai as Lai Qing-mei 
 An Jun Can as Fan Tong-dao 
 Xiao Xiao as Sha Zhi
 Duo Ru Ru as Xiang Zi
 Chang Kuo-chu as Chong Zhi
 Leon Dai as Ming Gao
 Ying Cai Ling (應采靈) as Qi Luo's mother
 Tang Zhi Wei as Qi Luo's stepfather
 Lin Li Yang Ming Gao's friend
 Ding Ning as Chong Zhi's secretary
 Kingone Wang (cameo) as Ling and Sheng's biological father
 Renzo Liu as Professor Shi
 Guo Shi Lun
 Huang Tai-an as Ah Jian
 Lee Lee-zen as Chen Chung-chih (youth)

Soundtrack
 Opening theme song: "零" (Ling) [Zero] – Alan Kuo (柯有倫)
 Ending theme song: "讓我愛你" (Rang Wo Ai Ni) [Let Me Love You] - Vic Chou and Barbie Shu

Mars Original Soundtrack (戰神MARS 電視原聲帶)
 Released: 10 September 2004
 Label: Sony Music Entertainment (Taiwan)
 Language: Mandarin
 Format: Studio album
 Genre: Mandopop

Track listing
 "零" (Ling) [Zero] - Alan Kuo (柯有倫) – opening theme
 "讓我愛你" (Rang Wo Ai Ni) [Let Me Love You] – Vic Chou and Barbie Shu (周渝民 and 徐熙媛) - ending theme
 "白色戀曲" (Bai Se Lian Qu) [White Concerto] – RaRa
 "The Hardest Note" – Megan Lai (賴雅妍)
 "說愛我" (Shuo Ai Wo) [Say You Love Me] – Liang Yi Zhen (梁一貞)
 "明天" (Ming Tian) [Tomorrow] – Da Di Le Tuan (大地樂團)
 "我可以" (Wo Ke Yi) [I Can] – You Hong Ming (遊鴻明)
 "零" (零的自我分裂之歌) [Zero – instrumental]
 "我可以" (達也的深情吶喊之歌) [I Can – instrumental]
 "讓我愛你" (綺羅的壓抑情感之歌) [Let Me Love You – instrumental]
 "說愛我" (晴美的渴望有愛版之歌) [Say You Love Me – instrumental]
 "白色戀曲" (桐島的白色之歌) [White Concerto – instrumental]

Book
 Mars Photobook (戰神MARS電視寫真書) –

International broadcast
In Thailand, it aired on Channel 3 on Friday to Sunday at 22:05 p.m. to 22:50 p.m., from October 15, 2004. and its re-run on Mondays to Thursdays at 2:15 a.m. to 3:00 a.m., from September 8 to October 27, 2015. This is the first rerun of this series in Thailand since its premiered 11 years ago.

References

External links
  CTS MARS homepage
  GTV MARS homepage
  Comic Ritz homepage

Taiwanese drama television series
Chinese Television System original programming
Taiwanese television dramas based on manga
Television shows written by Mag Hsu
2004 Taiwanese television series debuts
2004 Taiwanese television series endings